Mok Jin-seok (born 20 January 1980) is a professional Go player.

Biography 
Mok Jin Seok became a professional Go player in 1994 when he was 14 and reached 9 Dan, the highest level, in 2005.

He is called 'Goe dong' by media, which means a Boy wonder. His nickname derives from the fact that he has unconventional and adventurous style as well as fast reading skill in Go games.

At 15 years of age in 1995, Mok made his surprising debut on the world stage of Go by defeating Nie Weiping, one of the greatest players in China, at Lotte Cup held in Beijing, China.

In 1999, Mok was runner-up to the Asia TV Championship. He was defeated by Cho Hun-hyeon.

In 2000, Mok defeated Lee Chang-ho in the final of KBS Cup: no one among professional players younger than Lee had defeated him in the finals. From 2001 to 2005, Mok participated in Chinese Go league as the first foreign player: he got 48 wins and 17 losses.

His highest achievement in international competitions is the runner up at LG Cup World Championship in 2004: the winner was  
Lee Chang-ho.

In 2007, Mok broke a World Record for both the greatest number of wins and most matches in a year in Go—93 wins and 122 matches. He is also one of only 10 Korean players with over 1000 wins in official matches.

After Mok won his first big title in KBS Cup in 2000, it took 15 years for him to win another big title: that is, at his age of 35, Mok defeated Choi Cheol-han in the final of GS Cup in 2015.

He has managed the Korean National Go team as a head coach since 2016 and has held rookie's tournaments called 'Future's Star' for young players since 2015 .

He is fluent in Chinese and proficient in English.

Promotion record

Career record
1994: 8 wins, 2 losses
1995: 54 wins, 20 losses
1996: 64 wins, 15 losses, 1 draw
1997: 44 wins, 22 losses
1998: 59 wins, 21 losses, 1 draw
1999: 61 wins, 25 losses
2000: 62 wins, 23 losses
2001: 36 wins, 15 losses
2002: 43 wins, 28 losses
2003: 48 wins, 14 losses
2004: 24 wins, 18 losses
2005: 48 wins, 29 losses
2006: 44 wins, 21 losses
2007: 93 wins, 29 losses
2008: 59 wins, 35 losses
2009: 33 wins, 15 losses
2010: 47 wins, 25 losses
2011: 45 wins, 22 losses
2012: 41 wins, 27 losses
2013: 45 wins, 21 losses
2014: 27 wins, 26 losses
2015: 25 wins, 21 losses
2016: 25 wins, 18 losses

Titles and runners-up

Korean Baduk League

References

External links
GoBase Profile
Sensei's Library Profile

1980 births
Living people
South Korean Go players